The Port of Macau is the seaport of Macau, China.

History

Layout
The Port of Macau is divided into four areas:
The Interior Port (內港 - Porto Interior): Fairway is 45-55m wide and 3.5m deep. It includes the Inner Harbor Ferry Terminal
The Exterior Port (外港 - Porto Exterior): It contains the old Fishing Wharf and the Macau Ferry Terminal. Fairway is 120m wide and 4.5m deep
The Taipa Ferry Terminal, on Taipa Island, next to the Macau International Airport.
Kai Ho Port (九澳港 - Porto de Ká-Hó) on the northeast tip of Coloane Island contains the Macau Container Terminal, the Macau Oil Terminal and the docks of the Macao Cement Manufacturing Company and the Macao Electricity Company.

Administration

Operations

See also
 Transport in Macau

References

External links
Macau's Marine and Water Bureau website

Ports and harbours of China